Animax (formerly A+) was a thematic television channel which broadcast Japanese animated television series and films to Eastern European countries, including Hungary, Romania, the Czech Republic, Slovakia. It replaced the A+ Anime network in these countries on 2 July 2007. This was Animax's first major expansion to Europe.
The channel broadcast its programmes either dubbed in the local language of each country, or in Japanese audio with local subtitles.

The channel was closed on 31 March 2014 and was replaced by the Chellomedia channel C8. C8 started broadcasting in Hungary on 1 April 2014, and in Romania, Czech Republic and Slovakia on 5 May 2014, but in Hungary and Romania, it is also defunct.

History
Animax Eastern Europe replaced A+ Anime in Hungary, Romania, the Czech Republic, and Slovakia.

Sister channels
 Minimax
 Megamax

References

Animax
Sony Pictures Television
Sony Pictures Entertainment
Defunct television channels in Hungary
Television networks in Hungary
Hungarian-language television stations
Romanian-language television networks
Television channels and stations established in 2007
Television channels and stations disestablished in 2014
Defunct television channels in Romania